Fred Willis (born December 9, 1947) is a retired American football running back who played six seasons in the National Football League for the Cincinnati Bengals and Houston Oilers.

Early life
Willis grew up in Natick, Massachusetts and attended Marian High School in Framingham, Massachusetts and Kimball Union Academy where he was an All-American High School and Prep School player, in 1966 Willis broke the all-time New England schoolboy scoring champion, a record that had been held since 1950 by Lorne (Tippy) Johnson of Lynn English High School. He starred in football as well as in hockey, where he was a forward who led the team to an undefeated season, a league title, and the state tournament. He considered football and hockey scholarship offers from Michigan State University and the University of Notre Dame, but decided to attend Boston College.

College career
Willis played both football and hockey at Boston College, he was one of a few athletes to excel in 2 sports at an elite level. A halfback, he established a career rushing mark with 2,115 yards in three varsity seasons. He was the first Eagles' running back to surpass 1,000 yards rushing in a single season when he totaled 1,107 his senior year. He was voted All-America and All-East his senior season of 1970 and received the George H. "Bulger" Lowe Award (top football player in New England), and played in the postseason all-star Senior Bowl and Blue-Gray Game. He was also a top 6 forward for the Eagles' hockey team.

He was inducted into the Boston College Varsity Club Athletic Hall of Fame in 1977.

Professional career
Willis was drafted in the fourth round (93rd overall) of the 1971 NFL Draft by the Cincinnati Bengals. He posted similar statistics in each of his six years in the NFL, but during his rookie year of 1971, in which he played all 14 games, starting six at fullback, he had 593 rushing yards (a career best) on 135 attempts (a career-best 4.4 average) while scoring a career-best seven touchdowns. He also had 24 receptions for 223 yards (a 9.3 average).

In 1972, he played and started in the Bengals' first five games. On October 24, 1972 Willis was traded, along with fellow running back Paul Robinson, to the Houston Oilers for wide receiver Charlie Joiner and linebacker Ron Pritchard. For the Oilers, he played eight games, starting seven at fullback. His combined totals for both teams were 461 yards on 134 attempts (a 3.4 average) but he was especially effective receiving out of the backfield with 45 receptions for 297 yards (a 6.6 average) and two touchdowns.

In 1973, he started all 14 games, with 579 yards rushing on a career-high 171 attempts (a 3.4 average) and four touchdowns with career highs of 57 receptions and 371 yards (a 6.5 average) and one touchdown.

In 1974, his playing time went down as he played 10 games (with no starts) with 239 yards rushing in 74 attempts (a 3.2 average) and three touchdowns, with 25 receptions for 132 yards (a 5.2 average) and one touchdown.

He rebounded in 1975 with four starts in 13 games and 420 rushing yards on 118 attempts (a 3.6 average) and two touchdowns, along with 20 receptions for 104 yards (a 5.2 average).

His final year with the Oilers and in the NFL was 1976, but his production went up. He started in 12 of 13 games, with 542 yards in 148 attempts (a 3.7 average) and two touchdowns along with 32 receptions for 255 yards (an 8.0 average) and one touchdown.

In 1977, he played for the Denver Broncos.

Willis was the first running back in the history of the NFL to win the pass receiving title.

Fred Willis was a union representative and Executive Board member for the National Football League Players Association.

Fred resides in Salem, Massachusetts and has 1 son Brett Willis.

He founded a concussion diagnosis and treatment company called HPN Neurologic, In April 2017, he was ordered by a federal judge to no longer distribute improper communications to other players regarding his activity in the company NFL Players Brains Matter. Willis later moved to found another company NeuroSport Concussion in 2019.

References

External links
 Databasefootball.com page

1947 births
Living people
American football running backs
Boston College Eagles football players
Boston College Eagles men's ice hockey players
Cincinnati Bengals players
Houston Oilers players
People from Natick, Massachusetts
Sportspeople from Middlesex County, Massachusetts